Kau To Village is a village on Kau To Shan, near Fo Tan, Sha Tin District, Hong Kong.

Administration
Kau To is a recognized village under the New Territories Small House Policy.

History
The village historically shared a single higher earthgod shrine with Cheung Lek Mei, Ma Niu and Ma Liu Shui. All were part of the Fo Tan Yeuk. At the time of the 1911 census, the population of Kau To was 130. The number of males was 57.

See also
 Kau To Hang
 Kau Yeuk (Sha Tin)
 Ma Niu Village

References

Further reading

External links

 Delineation of area of existing village Kau To (Sha Tin) for election of resident representative (2019 to 2022)

Villages in Sha Tin District, Hong Kong